Spaubeek is a railway station located in the village of Spaubeek, in the Dutch municipality of Beek. The station was opened on 1 May 1896 and is located on the Sittard–Herzogenrath railway. Train services are operated by Arriva.

Train services
The following local train services call at this station:
Stoptrein: Sittard–Heerlen–Kerkrade

External links

NS website 
Dutch public transport travel planner 

Railway stations in Limburg (Netherlands)
Railway stations opened in 1896
Beek